Information technology infrastructure is defined broadly as a set of information technology (IT) components that are the foundation of an IT service; typically physical components (computer and networking hardware and facilities), but also various software and network components.

According to the ITIL Foundation Course Glossary, IT Infrastructure can also be termed as “All of the hardware, software, networks, facilities, etc., that are required to develop, test, deliver, monitor, control or support IT services. The term IT infrastructure includes all of the Information Technology but not the associated People, Processes and documentation.”

Overview

In IT Infrastructure, the above technological components contribute to and drive business functions. Leaders and managers within the IT field are responsible for ensuring that both the physical hardware and software networks and resources are working optimally. IT infrastructure can be looked at as the foundation of an organization's technology systems, thereby playing an integral part in driving its success. All organizations who rely on technology to do their business can benefit from having a robust, interconnected IT Infrastructure. With the current speed that technology changes and the competitive nature of businesses, IT leaders have to ensure that their IT Infrastructure is designed such that changes can be made quickly and without impacting the business continuity. While traditionally companies used to typically rely on physical data centers or colocation facilities to support their IT Infrastructure, cloud hosting has become more popular as it is easier to manage and scale. IT Infrastructure can be managed by the company itself or it can be outsourced to another company that has consulting expertise to develop robust infrastructures for an organization. With advances in online outreach availability, it has become easier for end users to access technology. As a result, IT infrastructures have become more complex and therefore, it is harder for managers to oversee the end to end operations. In order to mitigate this issue, strong IT Infrastructures require employees with varying skill sets. The fields of IT management and IT service management rely on IT infrastructure, and the ITIL framework was developed as a set of best practices with regard to IT infrastructure. The ITIL framework assists companies with the ability to be responsive to technological market demands. Technology can often be thought of as an innovative product which can incur high production costs. However, the ITIL framework helps address these issues and allows the company to be more cost effective which helps IT managers to keep the IT Infrastructure functioning.

Background

Even though the IT infrastructure has been around for over 60 years, there have been incredible advances in technology in the past 15 years.

Components of IT infrastructure

The primary components of an IT Infrastructure are the physical systems such as hardware, storage, any kind of routers/switches and the building itself but also networks and software . In addition to these components, there is the need for “IT Infrastructure Security”. Security keeps the network and its devices safe in order to maintain the integrity within the overall infrastructure of the organization.

Specifically, the first three layers are directly involved with IT Infrastructure. The physical layer serves as the fundamental layer for hardware. The second and third layers (Data Link and Network), are essential for communication to and from hardware devices. Without this, networking is not possible. Therefore, in a sense, the internet itself would not be possible.

IT Infrastructure types

Different types of technological tasks may require a tailored approach to the infrastructure. These can be achieved through a traditional, cloud or hyper converged IT Infrastructure.

Skills

There are many functioning parts that go into the health of an IT infrastructure. In order to contribute positively to the organization, employees can acquire abilities to benefit the company. These include key technical abilities such as cloud, network, and data administration skills and soft abilities such as collaboration and communication skills.

Future

As data storage and management becomes more digitized, IT Infrastructure is moving towards the cloud. Infrastructure-as-a-service (IaaS) provides the ability to host on a server and is a platform for cloud computing.

See also
 Converged infrastructure
 Cyber infrastructure
 Dynamic infrastructure
 Hyper-converged infrastructure
 Information infrastructure
 Infrastructure as a service
 Infrastructure as code
 Software-defined infrastructure

References

Sources
 
 
 
Rouse, Margaret (2017). "A DevOps primer: Start, improve and extend your DevOps teams", "TechTarget Search Data Center". Retrieved 28 September 2019.

 
Information technology management